Astyanax can refer to:

Astyanax son of Hector, Trojan warrior
Astyanax (fish), a genus of fish
The Astyanax, an arcade game
Astyanax Douglass, an MLB player
a son of Heracles and Epilais
1871 Astyanax, a Jupiter Trojan asteroid